Piotr Łuszcz (18 March 1978 – 26 December 2000), also known as Magik (pol. Magician), was a Polish rapper and record producer. From 1994 to 1998 he was a member of the Polish hip hop group Kaliber 44. After he left Kaliber 44 he formed the group Paktofonika with Sebastian Salbert (stage name "Rahim"), and Wojciech Alszer (stage name "Fokus").

Łuszcz committed suicide on 26 December 2000 at around 6.15 a.m. by jumping from the window of his ninth-floor apartment. He was pronounced dead in a local hospital at around 6.45 a.m., leaving behind his wife Justyna and his 3-year-old son Filip.

Discography 
 Kaliber 44
 Usłysz Nasze Demo! (1994) (Demo)
 Księga Tajemnicza. Prolog (1996)
 W 63 minuty dookoła świata (1998)
 Paktofonika
 Kinematografia (2000)
 Archiwum Kinematografii (2002)

References 

1978 births
2000 suicides
People from Jelenia Góra
Polish rappers
Polish record producers
Suicides in Poland
Suicides by jumping